The Twenty-fifth Anniversary Anthology is a compilation album released by the Fixx in 2006 in celebration of their 25th anniversary. It contains singles, album and live tracks from their previous albums, together with a cover version of Nancy Sinatra's "These Boots Are Made for Walkin'" that was originally recorded for the multi-artist album When Pigs Fly: Songs You Thought You'd Never Hear. The eight-page booklet contains an essay by Josh Norek.

Track listing
CD 1
"Stand or Fall" – 3:46
"The Fool" – 5:16
"Red Skies" – 4:15
"Shuttered Room" – 2:46
"Lost Planes" – 3:20
"One Thing Leads to Another" (Live) – 3:36
"Deeper And Deeper" (Live) – 4:30
"Saved by Zero" – 3:34
"Are We Ourselves?" (Live) – 3:06
"Secret Separation" (Live) – 3:53
"Built for the Future" – 4:03
"Driven Out" – 3:58
"Precious Stone" – 3:03
"Calm Animals" – 4:08
"Shred of Evidence" – 3:39
"Cause to be Alarmed" – 3:44
"All is Fair" (Live) –  – 4:30
"How Much is Enough?" – 3:58
"No One Has to Cry" – 4:02

CD 2
"Woman on a Train" (Acoustic) – 6:32
"Cameras in Paris" (Acoustic) – 5:13
"One Jungle" (Acoustic) – 3:32
"Freeman" – 6:07
"Mayfly" – 5:44
"Two Different Views" – 5:02
"We Once Held Hands" – 7:45
"Happy Landings" – 4:17
"These Boots Are Made for Walkin'" – 5:42
"Want That Life" – 3:49
"Are You Satisfied?" – 5:46
"You Don't Have to Prove Yourself" – 4:11
"No Hollywood Ending" – 3:53
"Touch" – 4:36
"Saved by Zero" (Acoustic) – 5:53

References

External links
 [ The Twenty-fifth Anniversary Anthology], Allmusic

The Fixx albums
2006 compilation albums